Mirinaba is a genus of air-breathing land snails, terrestrial pulmonate gastropod mollusks in the family Strophocheilidae.

Species 
Species within the  genus Mirinaba include:

 Mirinaba antoniensis (Morretes, 1952)
 Mirinaba cadeadensis (Morretes, 1952)
 Mirinaba curytibana (Morretes, 1952)
 Mirinaba cuspidens (Morretes, 1952)
 Mirinaba erythrosoma (Pilsbry, 1895)
 Mirinaba fusoides (Bequaert, 1948)
 Mirinaba jaussaudi (Morretes, 1937)
 Mirinaba planidens (Michelin, 1831)
 Mirinaba porphyrostoma (Clench & Archer, 1930)
 Mirinaba unidentata (Sowerby, 1825)

References

Strophocheilidae
Taxonomy articles created by Polbot